Parazacco fasciatus is a species of fish in the family Cyprinidae. It is found in China and Vietnam.

References 

 Kottelat, M., 2013. The fishes of the inland waters of Southeast Asia: a catalogue and core bibliography of the fishes known to occur in freshwaters, mangroves and estuaries. The Raffles Bulletin of Zoology 2013 (Suppl. 27), pages 1–663

External links 

 Parazacco fasciatus at fishbase

Cyprinid fish of Asia
Freshwater fish of China
Fish of Vietnam
Fish described in 1927
Xenocyprinae